Volenice is a municipality and village in Příbram District in the Central Bohemian Region of the Czech Republic. It has about 400 inhabitants.

Administrative parts
Villages of Bubovice, Nouzov and Pročevily are administrative parts of Volenice.

Notable people
Marian Volráb (born 1961), glass artist and painter

References

Villages in Příbram District